The Shrinking of Treehorn is a children's book by Florence Parry Heide, illustrated by Edward Gorey, and first published in 1971. The main character in the book is Treehorn, whose parents barely notice when he shrinks.

Plot
Treehorn is a young boy who begins shrinking one day. The book opens with the line "Something very strange was happening to Treehorn," and the boy soon discovers that he is getting smaller when he cannot reach the candy bars and bumble gum he has hidden on a previously accessible shelf. (No reason for his shrinking is ever given in the text.) When his parents comment on it, they say, "Maybe he's doing it on purpose, just to be different." In the end, Treehorn returns to his normal size.

Sequels
The sequel to this book is Treehorn's Treasure (1981), followed by Treehorn's Wish (1984). The three books were collected in an omnibus edition, The Treehorn Trilogy, in 2006.

Film adaptation

As of 2019, an animated film adaptation directed by Ron Howard is said to be in development. The animation would be done by Animal Logic and distributed by Paramount Pictures under its Paramount Animation label. By April 9, 2021, the film's release date was scheduled for November 10, 2023. However, on May 16, 2022, it was announced that the film had been acquired by Netflix with Howard's Imagine Entertainment as its production studio.

References

1971 children's books
American picture books
Children's books adapted into films
Fiction about size change